Hummin' to Myself is a 1990 album of jazz and pop classics recorded by Dave Van Ronk.

Track listing
"Wrap Your Troubles in Dreams (And Dream Your Troubles Away)" (Harry Barris, Ted Koehler, Billy Moll) – 3:31 
"Makin' Whoopee" (Walter Donaldson, Gus Kahn) – 3:15 
"I Can't Give You Anything But Love" (Dorothy Fields, Jimmy McHugh) – 4:21 
"Sweet Georgia Brown" (Ben Bernie, Kenneth Casey, Maceo Pinkard) – 3:14 
"Hummin' to Myself" (Sammy Fain, Herb Magidson, Monty Siegel) – 5:24 
"Hong Kong Blues" (Hoagy Carmichael) – 3:30 
"I'm Just a Lucky So and So" (Duke Ellington, Mack David) – 4:32 
"The Fresno Shuffle" (Erik Frandsen) – 2:45 
"Gee Baby, Ain't I Good to You" (Andy Razaf, Don Redman) – 4:22 
"Two Sleepy People" (Carmichael, Frank Loesser) – 3:35 
"It Ain't Necessarily So" (George Gershwin, Ira Gershwin) – 3:28 
"Do You Know What It Means to Miss New Orleans?" (Louis Alter, Eddie DeLange) – 3:45 
"Jack, You're Dead!" (Walter Bishop, Dick Miles) – 2:50

Personnel
Dave Van Ronk – vocals, guitar
Christine Lavin – additional vocals
Keith Ingham – piano & studio arrangements
Harry Allen – tenor saxophone
John Pizzarelli – guitar
Earl May – bass
Link Milliman – bass on 6 & 11

Production notes
Produced by Sam Charters
Warren Bruleigh – engineer
Erik Behrend – assistant
Cover Photo by Raymond Ross
Session Photos by Sam Charters

References

1990 albums
Dave Van Ronk albums
albums produced by Samuel Charters